Ammonium dichromate is an inorganic compound with the formula (NH4)2Cr2O7. In this compound, as in all chromates and dichromates, chromium is in a +6 oxidation state, commonly known as hexavalent chromium. It is a salt consisting of ammonium ions and dichromate ions.

Ammonium dichromate is sometimes known as Vesuvian Fire, because of its use in demonstrations of tabletop "volcanoes". However, this demonstration has become unpopular in schools due to the compound's carcinogenic nature. It has also been used in pyrotechnics and in the early days of photography.

Properties
At room temperature and pressure, the compound exists as orange, acidic crystals soluble in water and alcohol. It is formed by the action of chromic acid on ammonium hydroxide with subsequent crystallisation.

The (NH4)2Cr2O7 crystal (C2/c, z=4) contains a single type of ammonium ion, at sites of symmetry C1(2,3). Each NH4+ centre is surrounded irregularly by eight oxygen atoms at N—O distances ranging from ca. 2.83 to ca. 3.17 Å, typical of hydrogen bonds.

Uses
It has been used in pyrotechnics and in the early days of photography as well as in lithography, as a source of pure nitrogen in the laboratory, and as a catalyst. It is also used as a mordant for dyeing pigments, in manufacturing of alizarin, chrome alum, leather tanning and oil purification.

Photosensitive films containing PVA, ammonium dichromate, and a phosphor are spin-coated as aqueous slurries in the production of the phosphor raster of television screens and other devices. The ammonium dichromate acts as the photoactive site.

Reactions

Tabletop volcanoes and thermal decomposition

The volcano demonstration involves igniting a pile of the salt, which initiates the following exothermic conversion:-

(s) → (s) + (g) + 4(g) (ΔH = −429.1±3 kcal/mol)

Like ammonium nitrate, it is thermodynamically unstable. Its decomposition reaction proceeds to completion once initiated, producing voluminous dark green powdered chromium(III) oxide. Not all of the ammonium dichromate decomposes in this reaction. When the green powder is brought into water a yellow/orange solution is obtained from left over ammonium dichromate.

Observations obtained using relatively high magnification microscopy during a kinetic study of the thermal decomposition of ammonium dichromate provided evidence that salt breakdown proceeds with the intervention of an intermediate liquid phase rather than a solid phase. The  has been identified as a possible molten intermediate participating in  decomposition.

Oxidation reactions
Ammonium dichromate is a strong oxidising agent and reacts, often violently, with any reducing agent. The stronger the reducing agent, the more violent the reaction. It has also been used to promote the oxidation of alcohols and thiols. Ammonium dichromate, in the presence of Mg(HSO4)2 and wet SiO2 can act as a very efficient reagent for the oxidative coupling of thiols under solvent free conditions. The reactions produces reasonably good yields under relatively mild conditions. The compound is also used in the oxidation of aliphatic alcohols to their corresponding aldehydes and ketones in ZrCl4/wet SiO2 in solvent free conditions, again with relatively high yields.

Safety
Ammonium dichromate, like all chromium (VI) compounds, is highly toxic and a proven carcinogen. It is also a strong irritant.

Incidents
In sealed containers, ammonium dichromate is likely to explode if heated. In 1986, two workers were killed and 14 others injured at Diamond Shamrock Chemicals in Ashtabula, Ohio, when 2,000 lbs of ammonium dichromate exploded as it was being dried in a heater.

References

External links

Ammonium compounds
Dichromates
Explosive chemicals
Light-sensitive chemicals
Oxidizing agents